Claas-Hendrik Relotius (born 15 November 1985) is a German former journalist. He resigned from Der Spiegel in 2018 after admitting numerous instances of journalistic fraud.

Early life
Relotius was born in Hamburg, and grew up in Tötensen with his father, a water engineer, and his mother, a teacher. He studied political and cultural studies at the University of Bremen, graduating with a Bachelor's degree. In 2008 he was employed as an intern at Die Tageszeitung ("taz") in Hamburg, and from 2009 to 2011 completed a Master's degree at the Hamburg Media School. During 2013 he worked as a freelance journalist in Cuba, supported by a scholarship from the Heinz Kühn Foundation of the State of North Rhine-Westphalia.

Career
As a freelance reporter, Relotius wrote for a number of German-language publications, including Cicero, Frankfurter Allgemeine Sonntagszeitung, Neue Zürcher Zeitung, Financial Times Deutschland, Die Tageszeitung, Die Welt, Süddeutsche Zeitung Magazin, Die Weltwoche, Die Zeit and Reportagen.

In 2017, he became a staff journalist for Der Spiegel, which had published almost 60 articles by Relotius since 2011. Relotius received several awards for his reporting, including the Deutscher Reporterpreis on four occasions, most recently in 2018. The award given by Reporterpreis to Relotius in 2018 was for "Best Reportage", delivered in Berlin in early December, for a story of "unprecedented lightness, density and relevance, which never leaves open the sources on which it is based". He was the German-language CNN "Journalist of the Year" in 2014 for a story written for the Swiss magazine Reportagen and won the European Press Prize in 2017. Reporting for which he was nominated or won prizes include articles about Iraqi children kidnapped by the Islamic State, a Guantánamo Bay inmate, and Syrian orphans from Aleppo who ended up as child slaves in Turkey. In 2017, Der Spiegel sent Relotius to Fergus Falls, Minnesota, for three weeks to write an article about Donald Trump supporters "to give readers better insight into Americans". These articles were all found to be made up. Relotius had also faked interviews with the parents of NFL footballer Colin Kaepernick.

Fabrication of stories
The magazine uncovered the fraud after a co-author of one of Relotius's articles about a pro-Trump vigilante group in Arizona conducting patrols along the Mexico–United States border, the Spanish-born  journalist Juan Moreno, became suspicious of the veracity of Relotius's contributions and gathered evidence against him. About a year earlier, two residents of Fergus Falls, Minnesota Michele Anderson and Jake Krohn suspected that Relotius' portrayal of their hometown was inaccurate. For example, Relotius lied about seeing a hand-painted welcome sign by the city limits that read: "Mexicans Keep Out". They investigated on their own when efforts to contact  on Twitter came to nothing. They published their findings in a blog post on Medium, detailing 11 of Relotius' most egregious falsehoods. As Anderson put it, "In 7,300 words he really only got our town's population and average annual temperature correct".

Relotius' superiors initially supported him after he said that the allegations made against him were false. They even suspected that Moreno was slandering him. However, in the face of mounting evidence of Relotius' deceit, the deputy head of the magazine's  (society) section and Relotius' immediate supervisor, confronted Relotius and told him that she no longer believed him. The following day, Relotius confessed, and  forced his resignation, calling him "neither a reporter nor a journalist". Relotius told his former colleagues that he was sick and needed to get help.  left his articles accessible for the time being, with a notice referring to the magazine's ongoing investigation into the fraud. The awarded article on an Alzheimer patient in a California prison was marked by the  magazine as under investigation. The issue of  published on 21 December covered the Relotius case over 23 pages with a plain orange cover.

Richard Grenell, the US ambassador to Germany, wrote to the magazine, complaining about an anti-American institutional bias and asked for an independent investigation. Grenell wrote that "These fake news stories largely focus on U.S. policies and certain segments of the American people." American journalist James Kirchick accused  of long peddling "crude and sensational anti-Americanism".

The scandal was seized upon by critics of the mainstream media in Western countries and was described as a moment of crisis for German journalism. Leaders of the German far-right party Alternative for Germany (AfD) wrote that it confirmed their view of the media as a "lying press".

On 23 December 2018,  magazine announced that it was filing a criminal complaint against Relotius. Relotius has been accused of embezzling donations intended for Syrian orphans he claimed to have met in Turkey. Relotius appealed to readers for donations, which were then paid into his personal bank account.

See also

References

1985 births
2018 scandals
21st-century German journalists
Defamation
Der Spiegel
Der Spiegel people
Fake news
Forgers
Fraud
Journalistic scandals
German male journalists
German newspaper journalists
German reporters and correspondents
Living people
Writers from Hamburg